The counts of Clermont-en-Beauvaisis first appeared in the early 11th century. Their principal town was Clermont, now in the Oise department but then within the ancient county of Beauvaisis in the province of Île-de-France. Following the death of the childless Theobald VI of Blois, Philip II of France bought the county from his heirs in 1218 and added it to the French crown. It was first granted as an appanage in 1218 to Philip Hurepel; with the extinction of his line, it was granted in 1268 to the House of Bourbon, and was confiscated with the Duchy of Bourbon in 1527.

First counts
 Baldwin I of Clermont (?–1023)
 Baldwin II of Clermont (1023–1042), son of Baldwin I.

House of Clermont

 Renaud I of Clermont (1042–1088), son-in-law of Baldwin II
 Hugh of Clermont (1088–1101), son of Renaud I
 Renaud II of Clermont (1101–1161), son of Hugh I
 Raoul I of Clermont (1162–1191), son of Renaud II and Constable of France

House of Blois
Louis I of Blois (1191–1205), son-in-law of Raoul
Theobald VI of Blois (1205–1218), son of Louis. He sold Clermont to Philip II of France in 1218.

Capetians (1218)
Philip Hurepel (1218–1234), son of Philip II of France
Alberic (1234–?), son of Philip, resigned the title to his sister
Jeanne, Countess of Clermont-en-Beauvaisis (?–1252), daughter of Philip. On her death without heirs, the title reverted to the crown.

House of Bourbon (1268)
Robert, Count of Clermont (1268–1317)
Louis I, Duke of Bourbon (1317–1327, 1331–1342), son of Robert. Louis exchanged Clermont for La Marche in 1327, but it was returned to him in 1331.
Peter I, Duke of Bourbon (1342–1356)
Louis II, Duke of Bourbon (1356–1410)
John I, Duke of Bourbon (1410–1434)
Charles I, Duke of Bourbon (1434–1456)
John II, Duke of Bourbon (1456–1488)
Charles II, Duke of Bourbon (1488)
Peter II, Duke of Bourbon (1488–1503)
Suzanne, Duchess of Bourbon (1503–1521)
Charles III, Duke of Bourbon (1521–1527). After his death, his fiefs were confiscated by the crown.

House of Valois
Charles II de Valois, Duke of Orléans (1540–1545)

Later Capetians

Henri, Comte de Paris, Duc de France (1957–1984, c. 1987–1999)
François Henri Louis Marie, Comte de Clermont (1999–2017)

References

Sources

 
Clermont-en-Beauvaisis